Bupyeong-dong is neighbourhood of Bupyeong District, Incheon, South Korea. It is officially divided into Bupyeong-1-dong, Bupyeong-2-dong, Bupyeong-3-dong, Bupyeong-4-dong, Bupyeong-5-dong and Bupyeong-6-dong.

External links
 Bupyeong1-dong 
 Bupyeong2-dong 
 Bupyeong3-dong 
 Bupyeong4-dong 
 Bupyeong5-dong 
 Bupyeong6-dong 

Bupyeong District
Neighbourhoods in Incheon